Spartacus Peak is an ice-covered 650 m peak in Delchev Ridge, Tangra Mountains, eastern Livingston Island in the South Shetland Islands, Antarctica.  The peak overlooks Sopot Ice Piedmont to the northwest and Strandzha Glacier to the east-southeast.

The peak was named after the Thracian warrior Spartacus (c. 109-71 BC) whose likely birthplace was in the Sandanski region, in south-west Bulgaria.

Location

Maps
 L.L. Ivanov et al. Antarctica: Livingston Island and Greenwich Island, South Shetland Islands. Scale 1:100000 topographic map. Sofia: Antarctic Place-names Commission of Bulgaria, 2005.
 L.L. Ivanov. Antarctica: Livingston Island and Greenwich, Robert, Snow and Smith Islands. Scale 1:120000 topographic map.  Troyan: Manfred Wörner Foundation, 2009.

References
 Spartacus Peak. SCAR Composite Antarctic Gazetteer
 Bulgarian Antarctic Gazetteer. Antarctic Place-names Commission. (details in Bulgarian, basic data in English)

External links
 Spartacus Peak. Copernix satellite image

Tangra Mountains